Deuterocohnia brevifolia is a species of plant in the family Bromeliaceae. This species is native to Argentina and Bolivia, but is also popular as a potted houseplant or ground cover elsewhere. A terrestrial species, it prefers sun or light shade and can grow in large dense mats of leaves given proper conditions.

Footnotes

References
M.A.Spencer & L.B.Sm., Bradea 6: 144 (1992).

External links

brevifolia
Flora of Argentina
Flora of Bolivia
Plants described in 1879